"Square Rooms" is a song by American singer and actor Al Corley. It was the first single from his debut album of the same name. First released in 1984; the song was a hit single in Continental Europe, and had a moderate success in the United States in 1985.

Background and writing
After two seasons playing one of the leading characters in the American TV series, Dynasty, Al Corley left the nighttime soap opera to become a singer.

The media-savvy singer affected the brooding look and attitude popular among pop stars and GQ models at the time: pouty, dark glances and tousled hair. His choice of image worked best in France, where his television performances elicited the unbridled enthusiasm of teenage girls. However, according to Elia Habib, a French charts specialist, his success was not only based on his physical appearance. Indeed, "Square Rooms"' music had a large popular appeal and had a production designed for the dance floor. It was produced and composed by the German musician Harold Faltermeyer, who had previously arranged "Self Control", a worldwide pop and dance-floor smash for Laura Branigan in 1984 which featured a similar vocal hook. Faltermeyer would achieve his greatest personal success later the same year, composing, performing and producing the score to Beverly Hills Cop, a 1984 film directed by Martin Brest, including its hit instrumental theme composition "Axel F".

Chart performance
"Square Rooms" was released first in Switzerland, where it was a hit, peaking at number 6 on 21 October 1984, and staying in the top 30 for ten weeks. The single debuted at no. 47 in the French Singles Chart on 5 January 1985. It climbed quickly and was no. 1 for five nonconsecutive weeks, from 9 March to 13 April 1985. After its peak, it lingered on the charts until its 27th week, on 20 July 1985. The song also achieved success in Italy (no. 12), Germany (no. 13) and Austria where it reached no. 15 in April 1985. "Square Rooms" was released last in Corley's native US, where the single was only a minor pop hit, reaching no. 80 on the Hot 100 on 1 June 1985. American dancefloors were more receptive than its radio airwaves; Corley reached no. 26 on the Billboard dance chart the week of 22 June 1985.

Formats and track listings

The 12-inch (long) version includes an entire additional verse prior to the first chorus. This verse is excised in both the single and album versions of the song.

Charts

Weekly charts

Year-end charts

Covers
A French cover version was recorded by France Lise under the title "On vit à deux".

See also
List of number-one singles of 1985 (France)

References

1984 songs
1984 debut singles
Al Corley songs
American synth-pop songs
Mercury Records singles
Hi-NRG songs
SNEP Top Singles number-one singles
Songs written by Harold Faltermeyer